Alla Anatolyevna Shishkina (born 2 August 1989) is a Russian synchronized swimmer. She won a gold medal in the women's team competition at the 2012 Summer Olympics, 2016 Summer Olympics and 2020 Summer Olympics.

References

External links

1989 births
Living people
Russian synchronized swimmers
Olympic synchronized swimmers of Russia
Olympic medalists in synchronized swimming
Olympic gold medalists for Russia
Olympic gold medalists for the Russian Olympic Committee athletes
Synchronized swimmers at the 2012 Summer Olympics
Synchronized swimmers at the 2016 Summer Olympics
Synchronized swimmers at the 2020 Summer Olympics
Medalists at the 2012 Summer Olympics
Medalists at the 2016 Summer Olympics
Medalists at the 2020 Summer Olympics
World Aquatics Championships medalists in synchronised swimming
Synchronized swimmers at the 2009 World Aquatics Championships
Synchronized swimmers at the 2011 World Aquatics Championships
Synchronized swimmers at the 2013 World Aquatics Championships
Synchronized swimmers at the 2015 World Aquatics Championships
Artistic swimmers at the 2019 World Aquatics Championships
European Aquatics Championships medalists in synchronised swimming
Universiade medalists in synchronized swimming
Universiade gold medalists for Russia
Medalists at the 2013 Summer Universiade
Swimmers from Moscow